César Vega (born 1962) is a Uruguayan agronomist, communicator, and politician.

He graduated as agronomist in 1987 at the Faculty of Agronomy of the University of the Republic. Its announcer radio program called «La voz delagro» in Radio Fénix 1330AM, promotes responsible consumption of fruits and vegetables.

He is a candidate for the presidential election Uruguay and parliamentary representation by the Partido Ecologista Radical Intransigente (PERI), founded in 2013. The program has an emphasis on the preservation of natural resources and are contrary to the open sky megaminería.

In the 2019 general election, he ran for president but lost however, he was elected national representative for Montevideo, a position he took on 25 February 2020.

References

External links 

1962 births
Uruguayan agronomists
Living people
Uruguayan radio presenters
Green politicians
Members of the Chamber of Representatives of Uruguay